The 2015–16 CEV Cup was the 44th edition of the European CEV Cup volleyball club tournament.

German club Berlin Recycling Volleys beat Russian Gazprom-Ugra Surgut in both matches of the finals. American outside hitter Paul Lotman representing Berlin Recycling Volleys, was titled Most Valuable Player.

Participating teams
The number of participants on the basis of ranking list for European Cup Competitions:

Main phase

16th Finals
The 16 winning teams from the Round of 32 will compete in the Eighthfinals playing home & away matches. The losers of the Round of 32 matches will qualify for the main phase in Challenge Cup.

|}

First leg

|}

Second leg

|}

8th Finals
The 8 winning teams from the eighthfinals will compete in the quarterfinals playing home & away matches.

|}

First leg

|}

Second leg

|}

4th Finals

|}

First leg

|}

Second leg

|}

Challenge phase
In this stage of the competition, the four qualified teams of the Main phase are joined by the four teams with best third-placed finish from the 2015–16 CEV Champions League pool stage.

|}

First leg 

|}

Second leg 

|}

Final phase

Semi finals

|}

First leg

|}

Second leg

|}

Final

First leg

|}

Second leg

|}

Final standing

References

External links
 Official site

CEV Cup
2015 in volleyball
2016 in volleyball